The 1985–86 Segunda División B season was the 9th since its establishment. The first matches of the season were played on 31 August 1985, and the season ended in 18 May 1986.

Overview before the season
40 teams joined the league, including four relegated from the 1984–85 Segunda División and 6 promoted from the 1984–85 Tercera División. The composition of the groups was determined by the Royal Spanish Football Federation, attending to geographical criteria.

Relegated from Segunda División
Salamanca
Granada
Puertollano
Lorca

Promoted from Tercera División

Plasencia
Lalín
Betis Deportivo
Córdoba
Ourense
Real Burgos

Group 1

Teams
Teams from Andorra, Aragon, Asturias, Basque Country, Castile and León, Catalonia and Galicia.

League table

Results

Top goalscorers

Top goalkeepers

Group 2
Teams from Andalusia, Balearic Islands, Castilla–La Mancha, Ceuta, Extremadura, Madrid, Region of Murcia and Valencian Community.

Teams

League table

Results

Top goalscorers

Top goalkeepers

Segunda División B seasons
3
Spain